Grosmont is a railway station on the Esk Valley Line, which runs between Middlesbrough and Whitby via Nunthorpe. It is owned by Network Rail and managed by Northern Trains. The station is also served by heritage services operated by the North Yorkshire Moors Railway.

History

The Whitby and Pickering Railway was a horse-worked line engineered by George Stephenson, which opened between Whitby and Grosmont in 1835. At the time, the station was known as Tunnel, named after the tunnel required to pass from Grosmont towards Beckhole.

In 1845, the railway was sold to George Hudson's York and North Midland Railway. Additional parliamentary powers were subsequently obtained by the Whitby and Pickering Railway to make various improvements to its alignment, as well as to permit the introduction of steam power. The line was also converted from single into a fully double track steam-powered railway. The first steam engine entered service at Whitby in July 1847.

At Grosmont a new wider tunnel and bridge were constructed, most likely to designs of John Cass Birkinshaw. A G.T. Andrews designed railway station was also built, creating Grosmont's first true railway station.

In 1854, the York and North Midland Railway was one of the three railway companies that came together to form the North Eastern Railway. In 1865, the station became a junction, following a deviation line on the route to Pickering, which was constructed in order to avoid the cable-worked incline at Beckhole.

Between 1900 and 1924, iron ore extraction resulted in the whole area under the station being mined, using the pillar and stall method. The North Eastern Railway purchases the ironstone under the station house and the river bridge, and made preparations to deal with subsidence elsewhere.

The North Eastern Railway built a short terrace of cottages just south of the tunnel. In later years, these were used by the North Yorkshire Moors Railway to house volunteers, but were subsequently demolished in 1989, to allow extensions to the running shed and workshops.

Two North Eastern Railway camping coaches were positioned here between 1959 and 1964.

The branch line between Grosmont and Malton via Pickering was closed on 8 March 1965, under the Beeching Axe. It was later reopened by the North Yorkshire Moors Railway as a heritage railway on 22 April 1973, and currently operates between Grosmont and Pickering, with services also extending to Whitby.

The station has appeared several times in the television series Heartbeat.

Services

Northern Trains

As of the May 2021 timetable change, the station is served by five trains per day (four on Sunday) towards Whitby. Heading towards Middlesbrough via Nunthorpe, there are six trains per day (four on Sunday). Most trains continue to Newcastle via Hartlepool. All services are operated by Northern Trains.

Rolling stock used: Class 156 Super Sprinter and Class 158 Express Sprinter

North Yorkshire Moors Railway
The North Yorkshire Moors Railway operates heritage services between Pickering and Whitby via Grosmont. Services run daily from Easter until the end of October each year, with some additional services at other times of year.

Gallery

Historic structures

References

Sources

Further reading

External links
 
 

Railway stations in the Borough of Scarborough
DfT Category F2 stations
Grade II listed buildings in North Yorkshire
Railway stations in Great Britain opened in 1835
Northern franchise railway stations
North Yorkshire Moors Railway
Former York and North Midland Railway stations
George Townsend Andrews railway stations
Grade II listed railway stations